Becket is a 1924 British silent drama film directed by George Ridgwell and starring Frank R. Benson, A.V. Bramble and Bertram Burleigh. It depicts the fatal encounter between Henry II and the Archbishop of Canterbury Thomas Becket.

The film is based on the 1884 play of the same title by Alfred Tennyson. It was produced by Stoll Pictures, Britain's largest film company of the era, at the Cricklewood Studios in London. The film's sets were designed by the art director Walter Murton.

Cast
 Frank R. Benson as Thomas Becket
 A.V. Bramble as Henry II
 Bertram Burleigh as Lord Leicester
 Arthur Burne as Grim
 Mary Clare as Queen Eleanor of Aquitaine
 Clive Currie as Herbert of Bosham
 Bert Daley as De Tracey
 Sydney Folker as De Broc
 Alex G. Hunter as John of Salisbury
 Gladys Jennings as Rosamund de Clifford
 William Lugg as John of Oxford
 C. Hargrave Mansell as Theobald of Canterbury
 Sidney Paxton as Archbishop of York
 Percy Standing as Sir Reginald Fitzurse
 Harry J. Worth as De Brito

References

Bibliography
 Goble, Alan. The Complete Index to Literary Sources in Film. Walter de Gruyter, 1999.
 Low, Rachael. The History of British Film (Volume 3): The History of the British Film 1914 - 1918. Routledge, 2013.

External links
 

1924 films
British historical drama films
1920s historical drama films
Films based on works by Alfred, Lord Tennyson
Films directed by George Ridgwell
Films set in London
Films set in Kent
Films set in the 12th century
Cultural depictions of Thomas Becket
Cultural depictions of Eleanor of Aquitaine
British black-and-white films
British silent feature films
Martyrdom in fiction
1924 drama films
Stoll Pictures films
Films shot at Cricklewood Studios
1920s English-language films
1920s British films
Silent drama films